Exeter is the third studio album by Swedish rapper Bladee. It was released on 8 April 2020 by YEAR0001. The entirety of the project was produced by Gud. In an interview with Spotify, Bladee revealed that the project was recorded over a week-long period while Gud and Bladee had stayed in Gotland, Sweden.

Track listing

References 

2020 albums
Bladee albums